The enzyme cyclohexa-1,5-dienecarbonyl-CoA hydratase catalyzes the chemical reaction

6-hydroxycyclohex-1-enecarbonyl-CoA  cyclohexa-1,5-dienecarbonyl-CoA + H2O

This enzyme belongs to the family of lyases, specifically the hydro-lyases, which cleave carbon-oxygen bonds.  The systematic name of this enzyme class is 6-hydroxycyclohex-1-enecarbonyl-CoA (cyclohexa-1,5-dienecarbonyl-CoA-forming). Other names in common use include cyclohexa-1,5-diene-1-carbonyl-CoA hydratase, dienoyl-CoA hydratase, and cyclohexa-1,5-dienecarbonyl-CoA hydro-lyase (incorrect).  This enzyme participates in benzoate degradation via CoA ligation.

References

 
 
 

EC 4.2.1
Enzymes of unknown structure